The 1853 Grand National was the 15th renewal of the Grand National horse race that took place at Aintree near Liverpool, England, on 2 March 1853.

Finishing Order

Non-finishers

References

 1853
Grand National
Grand National
19th century in Lancashire
March 1853 sports events